Parklands is an electoral ward of Newcastle upon Tyne in North East England. It encompasses the northern edge of the suburb of Gosforth, north of the Metro line and bisected north–south by the Great North Road to the northern boundary of the City of Newcastle, bounded to the west by the A1 and east by the A189.

It possesses large areas of green space including Gosforth Park Race Course, Gosforth Wood and Gosforth Lake, plus a number of golf courses. Melton Park contains the remains of a medieval chapel which is a scheduled ancient monument.

Component parts
For electoral purposes, following boundary changes in 2018, the incorporation of Garden Village and fields to the north on which North Gosforth Park housing is being built, Parklands Ward is divided into 6 polling districts

  - Grange Estate/Park
  - Brunton Park, North Brunton and Great Park east of A1 (Melbury and Warkworth Woods)
  - North Gosforth Park
  - Melton Park north to Sandy Lane and east to Salters Lane
  - Whitebridge Park and Halls Estate
  - Garden Village

The electorate grew from 8639 (2019) to 8848 (2020)

Education
There are six schools within the Parklands ward:
Broadway East First School
Grange First School
Gosforth East Middle School
Gosforth Park First School
Gosforth Academy, formerly Gosforth High School
St Oswald's Primary School

Other facilities
 Gosforth Park race course
 Gosforth Golf Club
 City of Newcastle Golf Club
 Parklands Golf Club
 Northumberland Golf Club
 Northern Rugby Club
 Gosforth Sports Association (rugby, cricket, baseball, Australian Rules)
 Red House Farm Juniors Football Club
 Benson Park (tennis, Bohemians football)
 St Aidan's Church
 Gosforth Park Nature Reserve
 Allotments (inc Three Mile, Woodlea Gardens)
 Local shopping at Brunton Park, Melton Park and Grange (Great North Road)
 Doctors surgeries (Brunton Park, Great North Road)

References

External links
 Newcastle Council Ward Info: Parklands

Districts of Newcastle upon Tyne
Wards of Newcastle upon Tyne